Proeulia domeykoi is a species of moth of the family Tortricidae. It is found in the Coquimbo Region of Chile.

The wingspan is 15 mm. The ground colour of the forewings is cream suffused with brown at the base. It is only preserved as a basal blotch with an oblique posterior edge. The hindwings are cream mixed with grey in the anal area.

Etymology
The species is named in honour of Ignacy Domeyko, a Polish professor, geologist and mineralogist.

References

Moths described in 2010
Proeulia
Moths of South America
Taxa named by Józef Razowski